Challes-les-Eaux (Arpitan: Chales), known as Triviers until 1872, is a commune in the Savoie department in the Auvergne-Rhône-Alpes region in Southeastern France. In 2019, it had a population of 5,609. Chambéry Aerodrome is located in the commune.

Chambéry-Challes-les-Eaux station, located in Chambéry to the northwest of Challes-les-Eaux, bears the name of the commune along that of Chambéry.

Geography

Climate

Challes-les-Eaux has a oceanic climate (Köppen climate classification Cfb) closely bordering on a humid subtropical climate (Cfa).

Population

See also

Communes of the Savoie department

References

External links

Official site

Communes of Savoie